Randu Penkuttikal is a 1978 Indian Malayalam-language film directed by Mohan from a screenplay by Surasu, which is partially based on the novel of the same name by V. T. Nandakumar. In a later interview, director Mohan said that he never read the novel completely, before or after the making of this film. He adapted the title as well as the lead characters but asked Surasu to weave a script based on those characters and not necessarily based on the novel. However, V. T. Nandakumar is given credit for the story.

Plot 
One of the earliest movies to explore the theme of lesbianism in a normalised way.

Cast
 Shoba
 Anupama Mohan
 Madhu
 Sukumaran
 Jayan as Collector (Guest Role)
 Surasu
 Janardhanan
 Vidhubala
 Innocent
 Jalaja
 Santhadevi
 Sukumari
 P. K. Abraham

Soundtrack
The music was composed by M. S. Viswanathan and the lyrics were written by Bichu Thirumala and Randor Guy.

References

External links

1978 films
1970s Malayalam-language films
Films directed by Mohan
Films based on Indian novels
Indian LGBT-related films
Films scored by M. S. Viswanathan